In the Basilisk universe, there are three main groups of characters, the Kouga Ninja, the Iga Ninja and others that are associated with the shogun. In the second season, The Ōka Ninja Scrolls, a number of new characters are introduced.

Kouga Ninja
The Kouga specialize in stealth and assassination with techniques that, for the most part, rely on subterfuge. Even abilities designed for battle, such as Gennosuke's Dojutsu, tend to be defensive in nature. In the second season, The Ōka Ninja Scrolls, a number of new characters are introduced.

Gennosuke Kouga
 (Japanese); Troy Baker (English)
Gennosuke Kouga (甲賀 弦之介 Kōga Gennosuke) the heir of Kouga Danjou who assumes leadership of the clan following his grandfather's death. An idealist and scholar who believes in looking to the future instead of being dominated by the past, Gennosuke views the pursuit of any grudge to be an ultimately pointless and self-destructive practice. He adheres to his ideals even after learning of the Hattori Truce's absolvement, prompting him to lead the Kouga on an expedition to Sunpu to plead with former Shogun Ieyasu and Hattori Hanzou to reinstate the treaty before any further bloodshed occurs. Yet despite being a man of peace, if pushed into a corner Gennosuke is more than capable of killing anyone who threatens him or his clansmen. In addition to his skill with the sword, Gennosuke wields a power passed down his bloodline called Dojutsu. A hypnosis technique, Dojutsu allows Gennosuke the ability to reverse the homicidal intent of anyone who meets his stare directly effectively causing them to kill themselves instead of him. Because of his power, the Iga level the playing field by temporarily blinding Gennosuke with the same Seven Days of Darkness ointment Oboro used on herself.

Prior to the conflict's renewal, Gennosuke had sought to end the clan hostilities by marrying the Iga Princess Oboro, whom he loved to a great extent. His feelings for her remain even as the body count among both clans rises, filling him with torment as he struggles to reconcile his personal feelings with the duty demanded of him as his clan's leader. In the anime, Gennosuke carries with him a flute which he frequently plays for Oboro and which symbolizes their hope of bringing the clans together in peace.

Eventually, unable to avoid facing Oboro, Gennosuke resigns himself to letting her kill him. Instead, Oboro kills herself whereupon Gennosuke writes in the scroll that the final person to survive was Oboro before joining her in death.

Kagerou

Kagerou (陽炎 Kagerō) is extremely attractive woman as well as an expert combatant (she carries a shikomizue in her walking cane and is highly adept at shurikenjutsu). Kagerou's sensuality is her deadliest weapon as her breath becomes poisonous when she's sexually aroused, an ability passed down by her mother. She's deeply and madly in love with her superior and cousin Kouga Gennosuke. But due to Gennosuke's feelings for Oboro and her own technique, she's unable to be with him either emotionally or physically; resulting in a jaded persona filled with envy and bitterness. Kagerou's favorite target for her frustrations is Oboro and was one of the more vocal opponents of her and Gennosuke's marriage, being quick to belittle and criticize Oboro every chance she gets. Captured by Tenzen following an attempt to assassinate Oboro, Kagerou was tortured to the brink of death. In her last moments, feeling that the Kouga were doomed to defeat and desiring to go to death with the one that she loves, Kagerou attempts to kill Gennosuke but is stopped by Oboro using her eye technique.

Kisaragi Saemon

The elder brother of Okoi, Kisaragi Saemon (如月 左衛門) conducts himself in both war and peace with an almost professional sense of detachment. The only person he shows any real emotion to is his sister. Following Okoi's capture and death at the Iga's hands; Saemon throws himself whole-heartedly into the war between Koga and Iga, viewing victory for his clan and revenge for his sister as one and the same. Over the course of the battles, Saemon begins to understand and even agree with Gennosuke's views on the futility of revenge. Nevertheless, he also understands that the hostility on both sides makes reconciliation an impossible alternative.

A specialist in stealth and infiltration; Saemon is able to assume another person's identity by pressing their face into a raised mound of mud or soft clay, forming a mold with which he can insert his own face into to assume their appearance. This, along with his talent for impersonating voices, makes Saemon a master of disguise. His technique however is only effective cosmetically. It doesn't bestow him with any of a person's memories or abilities and anything with senses superior to a human's (as Hotarubi's snake proved) are able to see through it. Saemon is also one of the Kouga's more capable fighters, at one point successfully defending himself against multiple Iga ninjas at once. Saemon was the only ninja to be killed by forces other than Kouga or Iga, when Tenzen violated the honor code of the two clans and enlisted the help of Lady Okufu's vassals to gain the upper hand, and Saemon is impaled through the torso atop a bridge. By the end, Saemon killed Hotarubi and assisted in the deaths of three other Iga ninjas (Yashamaru, Koshiro, and Akeginu).

Muroga Hyouma

Muroga Hyouma (室賀 豹馬 Muroga Hyōma) is Gennosuke's uncle and the second in command to Danjo. Like Gennosuke, Hyouma possesses the Doujutsu technique and was the one who originally taught Gennosuke how to use it. Unlike Gennosuke, Hyouma's Dojutsu is always in effect so he must keep his eyes shut or else risk accidentally killing the wrong person at the wrong time. To compensate, Hyouma develops an almost radar-like sense of hearing that makes it impossible for him to be snuck up on. Hyouma's Doujutsu can only be used at night. Although he distrusts the Iga; Hyouma understands that despite whatever differences may exist between people, they are still humans who live, feel, and die the same way. It was due to Hyouma's teachings that Gennosuke was able to see past his clan's hatred for the Iga and attempt to establish peace, which Hyouma supports whole heartedly. He easily kills Mino Nenki with his Doujutsu when Mino Nenki underestimates his two blind opponents, Hyouma and the recently blinded Gennosuke. He dies in a duel with the now-blinded Koshirou. Due to Koshirou being blind, Hyouma could not use his Doujutsu on him. Koshiro slashes Hyouma's ear, which destroys Hyouma's ability to locate his opponent through hearing. Though Hyouma dies, he stays standing on his feet in the end. He is the seventh of the Kouga's chosen 10 to die.

Kasumi Gyoubu

Tall, bald, and powerfully muscled, Kasumi Gyoubu (霞 刑部 Kasumi Gyōbu) is strong enough to break an enemy in half with nothing more than his bare hands.  Like Saemon, he specializes in stealth and infiltration. By using his technique to merge into any solid surface, Gyoubu gains the cover to move and attack in complete secrecy as well as manipulate any object in physical contact with the surface. Because only his body can merge, he must strip naked as well as drop any weapons he carries in order to use the technique. He hates the Iga overwhelmingly as years earlier, Gyoubu's father Renbu was murdered by an Iga squad and Gyoubu vowed to one day take revenge, since his father's last words were to never pity any ninja. However, the Hattori truce was imposed on both clans shortly afterward and Gyoubu shaved his head as a statement of his unsatisfied fury. In the anime, Gyoubu shares an uncle/niece bond with the tomboyish Okoi whom he frequently takes with him to go hunt wild boar in the forests surrounding Manjidani. None of his backstory is included in the manga and his bald appearance is due to a physical condition, rather than a show of hatred. He is linked after being impaled in the heart by Tenzen. He is the sixth of the Kouga's chosen 10 to die.

Okoi

Tomboyish and energetic with a well-endowed frame, Okoi (お胡夷) embodies the popular concept of the Kunoichi (in contrast to both Akeginu and Kagerou who embody the more historically traditional version). She shares a deep bond with her older brother Saemon and is one of the few people who can make him smile. In the anime, Okoi also has a strong friendship with the normally unapproachable Gyoubu whom she often goes with to hunt wild boar in the forests surrounding Manjidani. Although she's a capable fighter, Okoi is not opposed to using her ample assets to lure men into a state of false security if she has to. For once they make the mistake of forming physical contact, Okoi is able to adhere her skin onto her opponent's and then absorb their blood into herself; leaving her enemies as dried up husks. Upon completion, Okoi must then vomit out the excess blood before she can use the technique again. As more contact equals faster blood drain she is dressed in a more revealing manner than the other kunoichi with a hip length sleeveless kimono and shortened hakama that resemble Daisy Dukes. Her death occurred when Nenki stiffened his hairs into needles and impaled her in multiple places, leaving her on the floor to die. She is the fifth of the Kouga's chosen 10 to die.

Udono Jousuke

Good-humored, a little dumb, and extremely fat; Udono Jousuke (鵜殿 丈助 Udono Jōsuke) hardly fits the traditional concept of the ninja. And as he proved with his interactions with Akeginu; he's also a bit of a lecher. Despite his boorish demeanor, Jousuke is more perceptive than he lets on and during his stay with Gennosuke in Tsubagakure, he was the first to realize the Iga were planning something suspicious before they silenced him. Additionally, while his corpulent physique suggests otherwise, Jousuke possesses remarkable speed and agility for a man of his size as he was able to easily avoid the attacks of both Rousai and Akeginu, two of the Iga's strongest fighters. His obesity is also the secret to his technique as it grants his body the consistency of rubber; allowing him to bounce like a ball, roll over enemies like a living boulder, deflect physical attacks with ease, squeeze through openings impossible even for someone a quarter of his girth, or even float into the sky by rapidly inhaling air to blow himself up like a balloon. He is killed by Jingoro after getting too cocky while he had the upper hand over him. Despite his quick death, he is likely one of Kouga's strongest ninjas. Jousuke was easily able to defeat Akeginu without realizing that the treaty was broken, despite her intent to kill him. Also, the impatient Gyoubu was calmed slightly when being told that Jousuke was with Gennosuke, and even thought it possible that Jousuke and Gennosuke defeated all of the Iga ninja already. He is the fourth of the Kouga's chosen 10 to die.

Jimushi Jubei

A living torso, Jimushi Jubei (地虫 十兵衛) lacks both arms and legs but is able to move by flexing his chest muscles to manipulate the armor plates sewn onto his tunic, allowing him to slither along the ground at extremely high speeds. He also has a metal tail attachment which he can use to deflect weapons and control himself as he moves. In place of arms, Jubei has trained his tongue to extend out of his mouth to manipulate objects as well as to draw and attack with the dagger he keeps sheathed inside his esophagus. He is gifted in astrology, which he uses to predict the Kouga's future with surprising accuracy. He is able to surprise and kill Tenzen with his hidden weapon, and retrieve the scroll from the Iga. However, his end is met shortly after when he encounters a revived Tenzen, who already knows about his secret weapon and slices him in half. He is the third of the Kouga's chosen 10 to die.

Kazamachi Shougen

Kazamachi Shougen (風待 将監 Kazamachi Shōgen) is a grotesque and malformed hunchback; Shogen's long gangly limbs and oversized hands and feet grant him the agility and dexterity of a spider. He also possesses a long prehensile tongue that secretes a sticky glue-like substance which Shogen can fling as pellets, spray as a stream, or even weave into a net similar to a spider's web. As such, Shogen is one of the few members of the Kouga ten who specializes in combat rather than stealth and assassination. His personality is sadistic and he enjoys toying with his enemies before killing them. When Hattori Hanzou summoned the clan elders to meet with him at Sunpu, Shogen was chosen by Danjo to accompany him as an example of the Kouga's fighting skills. During his attempt to return to Manjidani with the Kouga's copy of the battle scroll, Kazamachi was ambushed by the Iga but he managed to capture them in his glue net. However, he became distracted by Hotarubi's butterflies whereupon Nenki used his hair to bury one of Koshirou's scythes into Kazamachi's head. Alive but paralyzed, Kazamachi was repeatedly stabbed to death by Hotarubi when she demanded to know whether Yashamaru was safe and he defiantly spat in her face. Despite his quick death, Shougen is likely one of the strongest Kouga ninjas. He was able to even gain the upper hand on the four ninjas that ambushed him before he was distracted by Hotarubi's butterflies. He is the second of the Kouga's chosen 10 to die.

Later, during the Iga's surprise raid on Manjidani, Koshirou was attacked by an unnamed kouga ninja with deformities and skills similar to Shogen, suggesting that an entire family of spider-like ninja exist in Kouga.

Danjou Kouga

Lord of the Kouga Manjidani ninja clan, Danjou Kouga (甲賀 弾正 Kōga Danjō) was ordered by retired shogun Tokugawa Ieyasu to lead nine other warriors besides himself against the chosen ten of the rival Iga Tsubagakure clan to determine a successor to the shogunate. Danjo greatly specializes in the use of poisoned throwing needles, which he can spit from his mouth with lethal precision, it is also implied that he might've  also inherited the Doujutsu technique as it implied that it is inherited by bloodline. As a young man, he fell in love with the Iga chieftess Ogen whom he planned to marry so that peace could be established between their clans. Fate conspired against them in the form of a surprise attack on Tsubagakure by the forces of Oda Nobunaga with the assistance of the Kouga. Despite the fact the attack had occurred without his knowledge or consent, the crushed Ogen was unable to forgive Danjo for his clan's actions and their hopes for peace and happiness with each other were lost forever. Nevertheless, Danjo never gave up his desire of one day bringing peace between Kouga and Iga and years later, permitted his grandson Gennosuke to become engaged to Ogen's adopted granddaughter Oboro until Ieyasu's decree forced him to bring a decisive end to the longstanding feud by any means necessary. After sending Kazamachi to deliver the Kouga's copy of the scroll, he steals the Iga's copy from Yashamaru and then fires two darts into Ogen's neck. Distracted by Ogen's hawk, Danjou dies when the still living Ogen pulls out one of the needles and stabs him through the back. He is the first of the Kouga's chosen 10 to die.

Iga Ninja
Rather than relying on deception, the Iga prefer more direct methods and their techniques tend to be mostly offensive to better give them an edge in close combat situations.

Oboro

The adopted heir of the Iga clan, Oboro (朧) ascends to leadership following the death of Ogen only to have her authority usurped by Tenzen. Born with "mystic eyes", Oboro has the power to neutralize the techniques and special abilities of any ninja who meets her stare directly. This power is constantly in effect and has the potential to affect both enemies as well as allies. Prior to the lifting of the Hattori truce, Oboro is engaged to Gennosuke Kouga in an attempt to bring a lasting peace between both clans. In the anime, Oboro would frequently meet with Gennosuke along their clan's borders to practice a Japanese fan dance which they planned to perform for the guests at their wedding.

Sweet natured with a gentle disposition, Oboro lacks any real talent for either martial arts or ninjutsu and is also a bit of a klutz. This, along with her love for Gennosuke has caused most of Iga to view Oboro as a black sheep, a fact she is painfully aware of.

When the Hattori truce is lifted, the other Iga are quick to take advantage of Oboro's feelings for Gennosuke, tricking her into inviting him and Udono Jousuke into their compound where the Iga can keep them under surveillance. Although hurt and betrayed by their actions, Oboro remains loyal to her clan and is greatly torn between her duty and her feelings when the truth of the renewed conflict is finally revealed to her. Ultimately, she makes the decision to temporarily seal her eyes shut with a potion given to her by Ogen called the Seven Days of Darkness, knowing that if she saw any of her clansmen attacking Gennosuke, she might be tempted to use her powers against them instead.

Despite her best efforts, when Lady Ofuku and her faction enter the conflict, Oboro is forced to face against a blinded Gennosuke in the final episode. In an attempt to both defy her fate and make amends for the Kouga her clansmen had killed, she refuses to kill Gennosuke. Instead she goes up to him, tells him that she loves him, and commits suicide, ending her own life.

Yakushiji Tenzen

The second in command to Ogen, Yakushiji Tenzen (薬師寺 天膳) is able to wrestle control of the Iga away from Oboro following Ogen's death to become Iga's de facto leader. Although his initial impression is of a pragmatic fighter concerned solely for the honor and future of his clan, Tenzen is actually a sadistic and malicious individual who revels in conflict and bloodshed. He fights with a ruthless tenacity and won't hesitate to involve innocent bystanders to guarantee a victory. He also lusts after Oboro and desires to take her for his wife in order to become the true lord of the Iga even if he has to rape her to do it, which he attempts at least twice over the course of the series.

Similar to Himura Genma of Ninja Scroll, Tenzen's technique is one of regeneration and immortality. He was born sharing his body with a symbiotic being that usually conceals itself so that only its closed eyes are visible as a wart/growth on Tenzen's ears. The creature awakens whenever Tenzen is wounded or killed, moving through his body to regenerate him by "eating" his wounds, thereby restoring whatever ravages of time or battle Tenzen might experience. Thanks to his powers, by the time of Basilisk's beginning, Tenzen was already well over 200 years old though physically he looks no older than 30. Even when decapitated, Tenzen can regenerate if someone holds his head to his body while his symbiote seals the cut.

In the manga, Ogen tells Oboro that the symbiote creature is Tenzen's twin brother with whom he merged with inside their mother's womb shortly before being born. In the anime however Ogen stops just before telling Oboro where she believed the parasite came from, leaving its identity ambiguous. The anime also expands slightly on Tenzen's backstory, by identifying his mother as an Iga woman who was slain by her lover (a member of the Kouga ninjas and Tenzen's father). Baby Tenzen was then cut from his mother's womb and taken to be raised as a Kouga. Years later the Adult Tenzen would defect to the Iga where, unbeknownst to the others, he secretly manipulated both clans into retaining their hatred for each other in the name of his own vengeance.

Over the course of the story, Tenzen dies a total of four times at the hands of Jubei, Gyoubu, Hyouma, and Kagerou; before finally dying for good when he's decapitated by Gennosuke and then has his symbiote purged by Oboro's mystic eyes. For the most part, the Kouga ninja did not know what Tenzen's abilities were, which allowed Tenzen to kill several of the Kouga ninja who thought he was dead. He used this tactic to kill Jubei, Gyoubu, Saemon, and to capture Kagerou (leading to her death).

Akeginu
 
As the bodyguard and confidant of Princess Oboro, Akeginu (朱絹) is more forgiving of Oboro's lack of ninja skills than the rest of their clan, caring for her almost as an older sister. Regardless, her first loyalty is to the whole of Iga and when word of the Hattori Truce's absolvement reaches her, Akeginu has no reservations about deceiving Oboro while aiding her clansmen in their attempt to assassinate the Kouga ten, including Gennosuke. Despite her duties, Akeginu does feel some degree of sympathy for Oboro's predicament and is one of the few members of Iga besides Tenzen's apprentice Koshirou who doesn't ostracize her following Oboro's decision to seal her eyes. She even keeps safe from the other Iga the flute Gennosuke left behind in Tsubagakure so Oboro would have a memento of him after the war's end.  She's also in love with Koshirou, whom she wishes to marry.

A highly attractive woman, Akeginu (like Kagerou her Kouga counterpart) is representative of the historically accurate version of the kunoichi in her ability to use her sex appeal against the opposite sex. In combat, her technique enables her to secrete blood from her pores which she can then squirt into an opponents face to blind them or to create a fine mist which grants her the cover to move and attack in complete stealth. Her technique can also be used to "tag" an opponent who specializes in covert movement, as she demonstrated during Tenzen's duel with Gyoubu.

After Koshirou was killed by Kagerou, a revenge-driven Akeginu was led by Saemon (who had taken the appearance of Tenzen) to a bridge where she then attempted to kill Kagerou only to be grabbed by Saemon which then allowed Kagerou to stab her through the heart. Afterwards, Akeginu's body is dumped into the nearby river, and drifted into the sunset.

Chikuma Koshirou

Apprentice to Tenzen, Chikuma Koshirou (筑摩 小四郎 Chikuma Koshirō)'s technique enables him to create miniature whirlwinds with his breath which suck his enemies in and then shreds them to pieces. He also wields a pair of kama hand scythes, which he can use in close combat or throw like boomerangs. After Gennosuke learned of the Hattori Truce's absolvement, Tenzen sent Koshirou to eliminate him. However, when Oboro attempted to stop the fight, Gennosuke used his Dojutsu to turn Koshirou's whirlwind back onto himself and completely destroy Koshirou's eyes. Gradually, Koshirou learns to use his other senses to compensate but still requires some sort of assistance to effectively fight.

Koshirou and Oboro grew up together, and despite the differences in their stations she sees him as an older brother. Koshirou himself is completely devoted to Oboro and is even suggested to have romantic feelings for her. His loyalty to Tenzen compels him to follow his sensei's orders regardless of how he personally feels. He's also the love interest of Akeginu although he's more or less oblivious to it otherwise.

In the anime Koshirou is an expert woodcarver and after being blinded, learns to carve with equal skill using his sense of touch alone.  Of all of Basilisk's characters, Koshirou varies the most between the anime and the original manga, where he shares Tenzen's sheer ruthlessness and arrogance in combat, while the anime depicts him as being more reluctant to fight any battle where his opponents would suffer an overwhelming disadvantage.

After killing Hyouma, he was in turned killed by Kagerou using her poisonous breath, who he thought was Akeginu when Saemon (impersonating Akeginu's voice) tricked him into thinking that Oboro had been murdered by the Kouga. His death greatly disturbs Akeginu, who wants nothing but revenge afterwards - which leads her to her own downfall, at the hands of Kagerou and Saemon.

Amayo Jingorou

Loathsome and cowardly at heart, Amayo Jingorou (雨夜 陣五郎 Amayo Jingorō) is one of the few Iga ninjas who specialize in assassination rather than combat, preferring to sneak up on his opponents and being quick to flee once he suffers a disadvantage. He also openly mocks Oboro's unwillingness to fight, which in the anime almost gets him killed when an upset Oboro orders for no one to provide him with water which he needs to survive after using his technique.

By smearing himself with salt, Jingoro is able to dissolve into a viscous semi-liquid form; enabling him to slither through the tightest of passages, ooze his way up vertical surfaces, and silently creep onto his target to deliver the killing stroke. Remaining in this form for an extended period of time causes him to suffer extreme dehydration as his body gradually dries up and shrivels away, requiring him to immerse himself in water in order to restore his human form. His powers causes him to suffer an extreme fear of the ocean, as the salt water would keep him in a constant fluid state and causing him to completely dissolve.

Forcefully dragged onto a ferry during the Iga's attempt to catch up to the Kouga, Jingoro's fears are realized when Gyoubu throws him overboard and into the bay, where he quickly melts into nothing. Akeginu had attempted to retrieve him, but couldn't get to him in time due to Oboro's safety being her top priority; when she finally was able to help Jingoro, all that was left of him was a jacket floating in the ocean.

Hotarubi

A petite and slender young woman with straight dark hair that drapes to just below her shoulders, Hotarubi (蛍火) embodies the concept of the traditional Japanese beauty. Although she shares her clan's hatred for the Kouga, Hotarubi's prime concern is for her fiancé Yashamaru, another member of the Iga ten. Her devotion to him is so great that even the suggestion that he's come to harm is enough to send her into reactions that range from a mere evil stare (like when Mino Nenki makes a bad joke about it) to a feral rage (when Shougen refuses to tell her if Yashamaru is alive or not, and she brutally stabs him to death). Like most of the Iga, Hotarubi considers Oboro to be a completely useless leader and defers to Tenzen's orders. In the anime, this may be tied to slight jealousy, since Yashamaru once teased her for not being sweet and feminine like Oboro and a comically offended Hotarubi threw a childish tantrum at him.

In combat, Hotarubi summons swarms of glowing pink butterflies that overwhelm and distract her opponents, allowing her to either strike a lethal blow through their dropped defenses with her tantō or escape to safety. She also maintains a spiritual link with her pet viper who acts as her bodyguard and scout. In the anime, Hotarubi summons and controls her butterflies through a barely audible chant.

Hotarubi was brutally killed by the Koga ninja Saemon while he was disguised as Mino Nenki. Already weakened from a wound on her leg, after Hotarubi unmasks him she is no match for Saemon, who cuts off both of her arms to prevent her from summoning her butterflies and then stabs her through the chest. However, with an obvious sense of mercy and honor, he gives a slight nod to the dying Hotarubi when, delusional in her final moments, she pictured him as Yashamaru. Her body falls into a ravine, but she dies in peace and with a sad smile on her lips, believing in her last moments to have been with Yashamaru.

Mino Nenki

With his simian features, excessive body hair, and use of a bo staff, Mino Nenki (蓑 念鬼) bears a strong resemblance to Sun Wukong, the monkey king of Chinese Mythology. His demeanor is boisterous and arrogant, which often makes him underestimate his opponents and leads him to act carelessly in battle, despite frequent orders from Tenzen to the contrary. Nenki is also more patient than the other Iga with Oboro's indecision, viewing her infatuation for Gennosuke as a childish phase born out of her sheltered view of the world and believing that as time goes by she'll eventually grow out of it.

Mino Nenki is one of Iga's strongest fighters. Although lethally proficient with his staff, Nenki's greatest weapon is the control he exercises over his own hair. Draping down his back in a tangled mat, Nenki is able to straighten his hair and manipulate it as a grasping tool. His hair is also strong enough to swing him from tree to tree (leaving his hands free for combat) or even to wrap around an enemy and crush them like a Boa Constrictor. Beneath his robes, his body is covered in coarse fur that can be stiffened into needles to skewer any opponent that gets too close and also provides protection from certain techniques; this the technique he uses to kill Okoi, in example, stabbing her to death when she attacks him after killing Rousai. In the manga, Nenki's hair reflects his moods; writhing wildly whenever he becomes enraged or excited.

Nenki is ultimately killed by underestimating Hyoma, thinking of him as a blind and defenseless target, only to be engulfed by Hyoma's Doujutsu and subsequently strangles himself to death with his own hair.

Azuki Rousai

The second oldest of the Iga after Tenzen, Azuki Rousai (小豆 蠟斎 Azuki Rōsai) is a short statured elderly man with an even shorter temper and a massive gourd-shaped head, which in the anime he claims is swollen with hatred for the Koga due to their surprise assault on the Iga alongside Nobunaga.

Although his frail and antiquated appearance says otherwise, Rousai is a highly skilled martial artist whose punches and kicks are capable of felling trees and smashing rocks with one blow. As such, he's one of the few characters who specializes in unarmed combat.  Additionally, Rousai's ninja technique enables him to stretch and contort his limbs in fantastic ways, allowing him to fight and grapple with his opponents from well outside their range of attack.

Being somewhat of a lecher, Rousai causes his own death during his attempt to interrogate Okoi. He threateningly caresses the captured girl's shoulder, allowing her to attach herself to him and drain all the blood from his body with her own powers, like a vampire or a leech.

Yashamaru

A brash and cocky young man, Yashamaru (夜叉丸)'s favored weapons are dozens of strands of garotte wires called Kokujou (black rope, or black binding) which are woven from the hair of young women and alchemically treated with natural oils harvested from wild animals, turning them as hard as steel. Yashamaru controls the Kokujou as though they are an extension of his own body, and can use them to tie an opponent up, slice them to pieces, flay them, or even stiffen the wires so they can pierce like needles. The wires are usually kept wrapped around Yashamaru's forearms, but extra wires are tied around his calves in the event his hands and/or upper body becomes immobilized. He also carries a cleaver in a sheathe on his back although his opponents rarely get close enough that he's required to draw it.

Chosen by Ogen to demonstrate the Iga's skills for Ieyasu, Yashamaru accompanied his clan's leader to Sunpu and was later charged to deliver to the Iga their copy of the battle scroll. After realizing it was lost, he is tricked by Saemon (voicing Tenzen) and then taken off guard by Gyoubu, who snaps his neck. Despite his quick death, Yashamaru is easily one of Iga's strongest fighters. He was able to fight on par with Shougen, who was able to hold his own fairly well against four Iga ninjas alone. Yashamaru was even able to gain the upper hand on Kisaragi Saemon before being killed by Gyoubu.

Unlike most of the Iga clan, the easygoing Yashamaru had begun to consider the Hattori truce beneficial as it allowed him a chance to live a peaceful and quiet life with his lover and comrade Hotarubi, whom he planned to marry before the treaty's cancellation resulted in all out war between the clans. The possibility of his death sends Hotarubi into recklessness, which proves to be her undoing later.

Ogen

As the elderly chieftess of the Iga Tsubagakure ninja clan, Ogen (お幻) was ordered by retired Shogun Tokugawa Ieyasu to lead nine other warriors in a duel against the chosen ten of the rival Kouga Manjidani clan to determine a successor to the shogunate. She shares a spiritual connection to her hawk which serves as her messenger and servant although it is unknown if she possesses any other abilities, though it is implied that she may have had the mystic eyes as Danjou had knowledge of them and Oboro likely inherited from her.

When she was younger, she was very much in love with Kouga Danjo and the two sought peace between the warring clans through their marriage. But following a surprise attack by the combined forces of Oda Nobunaga and the Kouga in which her grandfather was murdered, she lost all faith in Danjo and declared herself his enemy. Despite the Kouga's betrayal, Ogen was in her twilight years willing to make her adopted granddaughter Oboro the bride of Danjo's grandson Gennosuke in the hopes that the two of them could bring a definite peace and also find the happiness that she could not.

In the manga, while not outright hateful towards Oboro, Ogen tends to view her as a disappointment to the clan and is hinted to have only consented to her marrying Gennosuke due to her granddaughter's lack of fighting skills. In contrast, in the anime was more forgiving of Oboro's faults and even attempted to boost her self-esteem when she failed in her training by saying she preferred her as sweet and loving. She also took pains to hide the Kouga's actions following Nobunaga's surprise attack so Oboro wouldn't become infected with the Iga's hatred. This may be explained by how the details about relationship between her and Danjou are exclusive to the anime series.

Other

Tokugawa Ieyasu

The elderly former Shogun, who appears to be suffering from some sort of throat cancer as evidences by the bulbous growth beneath his chin. Although retired, he still possesses enough influence within the government to revoke the Hattori truce in order to resolve the succession dispute.  Historically, Ieyasu is regarded as an effective but extremely heartless ruler.  Basilisk maintains this image of him as he clearly views both Kouga and Iga as expendable in the face of ensuring political stability and his family's grip on power.

Hattori Hanzou (the 1st) Masanari

The head of a prominent ninja family from Iga Province who would later become chief of the Shogun's intelligence. In the anime, he helped the people of Tsubagakure escape Nobunaga's attack. The peace treaty between Iga Tsubagakure and Kouga Manjidani was originally implemented by him.

Hattori Hanzou (the 4th) Masahiro

The third son of Hattori Hanzou and the current leader of the Shogun's intelligence.  Although he dislikes the idea of turning Kouga and Iga loose, his loyalty to Ieyasu compels him to nullify his father's anti-war pact for the sake of avoiding civil war amongst the other Shogunate retainers.  He was amongst the audience that witnessed the duel between Yashamaru and Shogen at Sunpu Castle and would later witness the duel between Oboro and Gennosuke alongside his adopted son Kyohachiro and Lady Ofuku.  Although his demeanor can be considered cold and non-chalant, he was deeply moved by Gennosuke and Oboro's sacrifice and afterwards enacts a new peace treaty in which the spoils promised to the winner were evenly distributed between both clans.  He also recovers the battle scroll from Ieyasu and secures it in a hidden alcove of his mansion so that the memory of the 20 chosen ninja would not be completely forgotten.

Hattori Kyouhachirou

The nephew and adopted son of Hattori Hanzou the 4th (his birth father was Hattori Hanzou the 2nd). Kyohachiro was charged by Hanzou to monitor the duel between Kouga and Iga and then report the results to him and Lord Ieyasu. Although he initially has his subordinates witness the battles, following Gennosuke's victory over the Iga at Tsubagakure, Kyohachiro eventually decides that the Kouga/Iga duel is something he has to see for himself personally. Gradually, Kyohachiro begins to regret the slaughter caused for the sake of deciding the heir to the shogunate and because of this, Oboro in the anime entrusts him with Gennosuke's flute which she explains is their prayer for the future. After witnessing Oboro and Gennosuke's match alongside his father and realizing just what had been done to them, Kyohachiro leaves on a pilgrimage to Aekuni Shrine to present Gennosuke's flute as an offering, vowing that even if history forgot the sacrifice made by the twenty ninjas of Kouga and Iga, he would remember them always. In the manga, he doesn't appear until volume 4 when he reports to his father that Lady Ofuku had departed in an attempt to sway victory in the Iga's favor.

Nankoubou Tenkai

A Tendai Buddhist monk and political adviser for the Shogunate. Tenkai was the one who suggested to Ieyasu that since the Tokugawas are a military family, the succession dispute should be settled though some sort of organized duel between ninja instead of valued samurai. As the duel between the Kouga and Iga rages on, Ieyasu sends him into the inner castle to keep the peace between Ofuku and Oeyu. He later returns in Basilisk's sequel series, The Yagyu Ninja Scrolls, where he takes on a more saintly role.  He is the twin brother of Ashina Dohaku, who serves as the main villain in the second half of The Yagyu Ninja Scrolls.

Yagyu Munenori

A Kenjutsu instructor of the Yagyū Shinkage-ryū school, of whom the Tokugawa Shogunate was a loyal patron.  He was among the audience that witnessed Yashamaru and Kazamachi's duel at Sunpu and follows the war alongside Ieyasu.  Because of their barely reined hostility to each other and the awesome power of their techniques, he views the ninjas of Kouga and Iga as being more akin to demons than humans.

Ofuku

The godmother of Takechiyo and leader of the faction supporting his claim to the Shogunate.  A cold and heartless woman who murdered her husband's mistress and illegitimate child, Ofuku's only redeeming grace is her devotion to her protege Takechiyo whom see considers a surrogate son, at one point even risking her life to save his when the Kunichiyo faction poisoned him.  Knowing that if Takechiyo falls from power than so will she, Ofuku attempts to personally intervene in the ninja war despite orders from Ieyasu to the contrary.  After witnessing Oboro's suicide, Ofuku rashly orders her samurai to assassinate Gennosuke only to witness them die at the hands of his Dojutsu.  Although Gennosuke decided to spare her life, Ofuku is mentally crushed after the Iga's apparent loss and as punishment for her scheming, Hattori Hanzou decides to keep her in the dark regarding how Gennosuke abdicated victory.

Oeyo

The consort of Ieyasu's son, the current Shogun Hidetada.  Although she gave birth to both Kunichiyo and Takechiyo, she favors Kunichiyo and leads the faction supporting his claim to the Shogunate.  Oeyo is just as heartless and manipulative as Ofuku, her rival from long before the succession dispute, and is suggested in the anime that she or one of her followers poisoned Takechiyo's tea.

Takechiyo

Ieyasu's eldest surviving grandson, represented by the Iga.  His slow witted nature is the basis of the succession dispute.

Kunichiyo

Ieyasu's second grandson, represented by the Kouga.  Although the younger of the two brothers, Kunichiyo's intelligence and cleverness has caused many within the government to view him as more deserving of the Shogunate over his elder sibling. As an adult he was renamed Tokugawa Tadanaga and became the Dainagon of Suruga.

Oda Nobunaga

In the anime, Nobunaga makes a cameo appearance during the flashback of episode 1 as he leads the surprise attack on Tsubagakure. His appearance is similar to his depictions in the Onimusha and Samurai Warriors video game series with thin features, ghostly white skin, elegantly groomed mustache and goatee, and a western-style cape draped over his shoulders.

Kasumi Renbu

The father of Kasumi Gyoubu who appears only in the anime. Under the command of the Koga elder, Renbu was ordered to hunt down and eliminate any Iga who escaped Nobunaga's assault, but was stopped by Lord Kouga Danjo when he attempted to kill Ogen in the forests behind Tsubagakure. Despite being a ruthless combatant, Renbu's deepest desire was for his son to live a life free of conflict and bloodshed and eventually became a supporter of Danjo's desire to build a lasting peace with the Iga. Sent by Danjo to meet with them as a representative, Renbu and his companions were ambushed by an Iga squad who sought revenge for the attack he led on their clan. Renbu was mortally wounded during the fight and his final words to Gyoubu before he died was to never pity any ninja.

The Oka Ninja Scrolls
Broadcast in 2018, Oka Ninja Scrolls is a sequel to the original Basilisk anime series, after a 10-year time-skip.

Hibiki Iga

A young female inheritor of the Iga bloodline with the power to neutralize the techniques and special abilities of any ninja who meets her stare directly.

Hachiro Koga

A young male inheritor of the Kouga bloodline with the hypnosis technique, Dojutsu.

Gorone Negoro

A young man confined to a wheelchair who helps the young ninjas with his technical skills.

Namenba 

Gorone's partner whom assists him in observing and taking care of the ninjas.

Hachisu

A young female ninja who uses a rapid-fire Lotus Root gun technique.

Rui
 

A young female ninja who uses the Butterfly technique to control the passions of men.

Shaizou Ishi

A young male ninja who can dislocate and send his eyes out for observation, however this technique leaves his body vulnerable.

Shichigen Higurashi 

A young male ninja who can control centipedes.

Shikibu Kora

A strong young male ninja who uses body armour technique.

Utsutsu

A young female ninja whose technique of Dreaming Reality enables her to create illusions and control the movement of her scarf.

Shichito Gein

An old master ninja and who uses the Firefly Squid technique. He is killed by the Joujinshuu man Kujaku Tsuibamu.

Kaso Himonji

Master ninja and one of the Five Treasures of Kouga who uses a Katon technique. He is killed by the Joujinshuu man Kujaku Tsuibamu.

Tenshin Yusa

Master ninja and one of the Five Treasures of Kouga who uses the Thousand-Handed Kannon. He is killed by the Joujinshuu man Kujaku Tsuibamu.

Kazuma Kusanagi

Master ninja and one of the Five Treasures of Kouga who uses the Heaven's Lyre technique. He is killed by the Joujinshuu man Kujaku Tsuibamu.

Tsuta Hoetsu

Master ninja and one of the Five Flowers of Iga who uses the Root Lasso technique. He is killed by the Joujinshuu woman Yasha Itaru with her Destiny's Passage mirror.

Shogyo Kareha

Master ninja and one of the Five Flowers of Iga. He is killed by the Joujinshuu.

Irootoroe Itsuma

Master ninja and one of the Five Flowers of Iga. He is killed by the Joujinshuu.

Suiren Shuugetsu

Master ninja and one of the Five Flowers of Iga. He is killed by the Joujinshuu.

Joujin

A former palace official who gathers his own ninja, the Joujinshuu, to seize power and destroy both the Iga and Kouga ninja. His attendants include Kujaku Tsuibamu who uses the Inverted Halberd of Time and Rinne Magoroku.

Itaru Yasha
 (Japanese); Amber Lee Connors (English)

A Joujinshuu woman fighter who uses her Destiny's Passage mirror which reflects the failures of her opponents life, filling them with despair.

Kujaku Tsuibamu

A Joujinshuu male fighter who uses his Inverted Halberd of Time. He was a former servant of Oda Kazusanosuke Nobunaga called Ranmaru.

Rinne Magoroku
A Joujinshuu male swordsman fighter who uses a spinning technique to transport people before the Kokuuzou Bosatsu or Adamantite Tower.

Neiri Chiou

An elderly Joujinshuu man who can create realistic and dangerous illusions.

References

Basilisk